Mohsen Hashtroodi (Hachtroudi) (also romanized as Mohsen Hashtrūdi; December 13, 1908, Tabriz – September 4, 1976, Tehran) was a prominent Iranian mathematician, known as "Professor Hashtroodi (Hashtroudi)". His father, Shaikh Esmāeel Mojtahed was an advisor to Shaikh Mohammad Khiābāni, who played a significant role in the establishment of the parliamentary democracy in Iran during and after the Iranian Constitutional Revolution.

Mohsen Hashtroodi attended Sirus and Aghdasieh primary schools in Tehran and subsequently studied at the élite school of Dar ol-Fonoon, also in Tehran, from where he graduated in 1925. He obtained his doctoral degree in mathematics in 1936 as student of Élie Cartan in France. His doctoral dissertation (Sur les espaces d'éléments à connexion projective normale) was on differential geometry. By significantly generalizing the work of Cartan to the case of hypersurfaces in ℝⁿ, he constructed a projective connection used in studying systems of differential equations known as the Hachtroudi Connection. His subsequent research involved using intrinsically defined affine and Weylian connections to study the invariants of differential systems relative to different groups of transformations. He was a Distinguished Professor at University of Tabriz and University of Tehran. One of the Prizes of Iranian Mathematical Society is named after Professor Hashtroodi.

Mohsen Hashtroodi married Robāb Modiri in 1944. They had two daughters, Farānak and Faribā, and one son, Rāmin.

Professor Hashtroodi is buried in the Behesht-e Zahra cemetery in Tehran.

Notes and references
Hachtroudi, Mohsen (1937)  Les espaces d'éléments à connexion projective normale.
Thèse de doctorat, Université de Paris.

Notes and references

University of Paris alumni
Academic staff of the University of Tehran
Academic staff of the University of Tabriz
Presidents of the University of Tabriz
1908 births
1976 deaths
Burials at Behesht-e Zahra
20th-century Iranian mathematicians
Iranian expatriates in France
Poets from Tabriz